This is relating to the culture of Cincinnati, Ohio.

Annual cultural events and fairs

 Cincinnati Food & Wine Classic, a three-day festival held in September.
 Bockfest, a beer festival held in Over-the-Rhine on the first full weekend of March.
 Scribble Jam, a hip hop festival, now defunct.
 Cincinnati Pride, The Cincinnati Pride Parade and Festival is a week-long celebration of the city’s Lesbian, Gay, Bisexual, Transgender, (LGBT) Queer, and Ally community. The festivities are typically held annually at the end of June.
 Oktoberfest-Zinzinnati, celebrating Cincinnati's German heritage, is the largest Oktoberfest in the US.
 Cincinnati May Festival, a two-week choral festival held in May.
 MidPoint Music Festival is a three-day music festival that takes place in many venues across downtown and Over-The-Rhine in September.
 Riverfest, a festival and fireworks display on Labor Day weekend which draws crowds of over 500,000.
 Cincinnati Reds Opening Day Parade and Game (MLB Official Opening Day)
 Goetta Fest
 Flying Pig Marathon
 Cincinnati Flower Show
 Taste of Cincinnati, a food festival held on Memorial Day weekend and attended by over 500,000 annually.
 Bunbury Music Festival, a music festival started in 2012 which takes place on the banks of the Ohio River.
The Martin Luther King Day Parade
The Midwest Black Family Reunion
The Cincinnati Flower Show, organized by the Cincinnati Horticultural Society in late April. This floral event, endorsed by the Royal Horticultural Society, is staged at Symmes Township Park and claims to be the biggest outdoor flower show in the United States.
Thanksgiving Day Race, the sixth-oldest race in the country.
Since 1962 the Jazz Festival (now Macy's Music Fest) is held during July.
 MusicNOW Festival is a music festival started by Bryce Dessner of local band, The National, that takes place in venues in Over-The-Rhine.
The Tall Stacks Festival, held every three or four years to celebrate Cincinnati's riverboat history.
The Festival of Lights, hosted by the Cincinnati Zoo and Botanical Garden during the year-end holiday season.
The Cincinnati Fringe Festival 12 Days of Theatre, Film, Visual Art, and Music in the heart of Over-the-Rhine. Ohio's Largest Performing Arts Festival. Begins the day after Memorial Day.

Cultural and Entertainment Districts
 Cincinnati Main Street Arts and Entertainment District
 Fountain Square District
 Backstage District

Attractions

 Cincinnati Zoo and Botanical Garden
 Newport Aquarium (across the Ohio River)
 Cincinnati Museum Center at Union Terminal houses the Cincinnati Children's Museum, the Cincinnati Museum of Natural History and Science, the OmniMax Cinema, and the Cincinnati History Museum in the Art-Deco Cincinnati Union Terminal
 Krohn Conservatory
 Mt. Airy Arboretum
 Lloyd Library and Museum, world-class collection covering medical botany, pharmacy, eclectic medicine, and horticulture.
 Spring Grove Cemetery
 Coney Island of Cincinnati
 Kings Island, in Mason, 20 miles northeast of Cincinnati
 Soak City (Kings Island), in Mason, located inside Kings Island
 The Beach Waterpark, in Mason
 TPC at River's Bend, a golf club that hosts a Champions Tour event (men's senior golf)
 Western & Southern Financial Group Masters, an important tennis tournament held in Mason
 National Underground Railroad Freedom Center
 Taft Museum of Art
 American Classical Music Hall of Fame and Museum
 Cincinnati Art Museum
 Cincinnati Fire Museum
 Cincinnati Observatory
 Contemporary Arts Center / Rosenthal Center for Contemporary Art
 Drake Planetarium
 National Signs of the Times Museum
 Creation Museum

Food and Dining
Cincinnati's German heritage is evidenced by the many eateries that specialize in schnitzels and hearty Bavarian cooking.

Cincinnati chili

"Cincinnati chili" is "one of this nation's most distinctive regional plates of food," according to national food writers Jane and Michael Stern.  It is a Mediterranean-spiced meat sauce served over spaghetti or hot dogs  at several chains such as Skyline Chili, Gold Star Chili, Empress Chili, and Dixie Chili plus independents such as Camp Washington Chili.  The chili is best appreciated not in a bowl, as one would with the chunkier, "Tex-Mex" chili, but rather, as a sauce to cover a plate of spaghetti, covered in shredded cheddar cheese (3-way), the latter with onions or beans (4-way) or with both (as a 5-way), all topped off with oyster crackers and to some, hot sauce.  It can also be placed on top of a hot dog in a steamed bun with mustard and onions, and topped with cheddar cheese (referred to as a cheese coney).

Findlay Market

Findlay Market is the oldest continuously-operated public market in the state of Ohio.

Goetta

Goetta is a meat-and-grain sausage or mush of German inspiration that is popular in the greater Cincinnati area. It is primarily composed of ground meat (pork, or pork and beef), pin-head oatmeal and spices formed into a loaf and then sliced and fried, often in butter, "to a melt-in-the-mouth tenderness."

Graeter's

Graeter's is a regional chain of ice cream parlors that also sells baked goods and candies. It was founded by Louis "Charlie" and Regina Graeter, husband-and-wife immigrants from Bavaria, in 1870, and grew into a chain under Regina's leadership following her husband's death. The Graeter family still runs the chain, which has spread beyond the Cincinnati area with chain-owned and franchised locations in several regional metropolitan areas, plus one store on the Las Vegas Strip. Pints of the ice cream are also sold in grocery stores in all U.S. states except Hawaii and the Dakotas.

Oprah Winfrey is a fan of Graeter's and caused sales to skyrocket when she raved about the ice cream on her show.

Montgomery Inn

Montgomery Inn is a local barbecue restaurant that is internationally known for its signature sauce. Bob Hope would frequently have the restaurant's ribs flown to his home in California.

Dewey's 
Dewey's is a Cincinnati area-based pizza company that specializes in a variety of gourmet and delicious pizzas, salads, and calzones. Their fluffy crusted and original pizzas are a Cincinnati favorite, and there are many locations throughout Greater Cincinnati.

Larosa's Pizzeria

Larosa's Pizzeria is an Italian restaurant that is very popular in Cincinnati, known for its signature pizza with a thin crust, thick and sweet sauce, and provolone cheese. 

This pizzeria chain is based out of Cincinnati, in most Cincinnati neighborhoods (which is in Ohio, by the way). 

It also serves at major Cincinnati attractions including the Cincinnati Zoo and Botanical Garden, Riverbend Music Center, and Great American Ballpark.

Arnold's Bar and Grill

Arnold's Bar and Grill is the oldest continuously-operated bar in the city and one of the oldest in the country.  It was founded in 1861 and has had only four owners, most of whom have lived upstairs.

Fine Dining
Cincinnati was home to three of the eight Mobil 5-star rated restaurants in the United States in the 1960s; at the time, New York City had two. By 1986 Cincinnati had two 5-star Mobil restaurants, Pigall's and The Maisonette; it was one of only a few cities with two restaurants with the rating.

Pigall's was another Mobil 5-star restaurant. When Jean-Robert at Pigall's closed in 2009, it had earned five consecutive 4-star Mobil ratings and was the only Mobil 4-star restaurant in the tri-state area surrounding Greater Cincinnati.

Wine Spectator recognized 15 area restaurants for the excellence of their wine lists, including two at the "Best Award of Excellence" level, Jeff Ruby's Carlo & Johnny and Jeff Ruby's Steakhouse.

Until 2005, when the restaurant closed, the Maisonette carried the distinction of being Mobil Travel Guide's longest running five-star restaurant in the country. It received Mobil's highest rating for 41 consecutive years, more than any other restaurant in North America.The former Maisonette's chef de cuisine, Jean-Robert de Cavel, has opened several restaurants in the area since leaving The Maisonette. Jean-Robert's Table opened in 2010, French Crust in 2012, and Le Bar a Boeuf in 2014. 

The Gourmet Room, on the rooftop of the Terrace Plaza Hotel, was another 5-star Mobil restaurant in the 1970s.

Galleries
 Cincinnati Art Galleries

Historical structures and museums

 Cincinnati Ballet
 Cincinnati Symphony Orchestra, the fifth-oldest orchestra in the United States
 University of Cincinnati College-Conservatory of Music
 Harriet Beecher Stowe House
 Heritage Village Museum
 Hauck House Museum
 William Howard Taft National Historic Site
 Findlay Market

Parks and outdoor attractions

 Mt. Adams
 Clifton
 Mount Echo provides one of the most excellent views of Downtown Cincinnati from its West Side Price Hill location.
 Eden Park, Cincinnati, located in Mt. Adams, hosts the Cincinnati Art Museum, Krohn Conservatory, and Playhouse in the Park. It has extravagant water systems throughout the park.
 Fountain Square, Cincinnati includes the Tyler Davidson Fountain.
 Hauck Botanic Gardens, home to the  Civic Garden Center of Cincinnati
 Sawyer Point, Located along the shore of the Ohio River just south of downtown Cincinnati, this mile-long linear park features many different spaces serving all segments of the region's population. 
 Theodore M. Berry International Friendship Park, located along Cincinnati's downtown eastern riverfront area was opened to the public on May 17, 2003. The park is named in honor of Cincinnati's first African American mayor, Theodore M. Berry, who served as Cincinnati's mayor from December 1972 to November 1975.

 Cincinnati Riverfront Park is a proposed park being planned, part of The Banks project .
 Other parks within the city include: Alms Park, Ault Park, Inwood Park, Avon Woods, Kennedy Heights Park, Bellevue Hill Park, LaBoiteaux Woods, Bettman Center, Little Duck Creek, Brodbeck Preserve, Lytle Park, Burnet Woods, Magrish Preserve, Buttercup Valley & Parkers Woods, McEvoy Park, Caldwell Park, Miles Edwards Park, California Woods, Mt. Airy Forest, Drake Park, Mt. Storm Park, Fairview Park, Owl's Nest Park, Fernbank Park, Rapid Run Park, Fleishmann Gardens, Seymour Preserve, French Park, Stanbery Park, Glenway Woods, and Washington Park.
 For more parks within Cincinnati's Hamilton County, see: Hamilton County Park District

Music venues

 Annies
 Bogart's
 Live! at the Ludlow Garage
 Madison Theater, Covington, Kentucky
 Rhinos
 Riverbend Music Center
 Rohs Street Cafe
 Southgate House, Newport, Kentucky
 Taft Theater
 Timberwolf Amphitheater, Kings Island. Ohio
 20th Century Theater
 US Bank Arena

Theater
For a city of its size, Cincinnati boasts a vibrant community of theater artists, educators, and producers.  Audiences can attend professional, semi-professional, community, and educational theater opportunities year-round in the Cincinnati tri-state area.  Many theatres within the region are members of the League of Cincinnati Theatres.  In addition to theater experiences offered through most high schools, many of which are critiqued by local students through the Cappie Awards program, Cincinnati offers a number of college-level theater/performing arts training and performing opportunities.

Professional (Equity) theater
Cincinnati Playhouse in the Park
Ensemble Theatre of Cincinnati

Professional (non-Equity) theater
Know Theatre Tribe

Educational theater
University of Cincinnati College-Conservatory of Music
Xavier University
Northern Kentucky University

References